"In the Bible" is a song by Canadian rapper Drake featuring American rapper Lil Durk and American singer-songwriter Giveon. It was released on September 3, 2021, as the fourth track on Drake's sixth studio album Certified Lover Boy.

Background
The track sees Drake put himself below his son, Adonis Graham, to "explain away emotional stuntedness" on the chorus, in which he sings the line: "You don't know love, you don't love me like my child". He also boasts about his body count and asks a woman for her body count. Drake delivers an "intriguing" vocal turn throughout the song. He also raps a verse. Lil Durk received praise for rapping about his girlfriend, India Royale, in his verse, specifically promoting her cosmetics line.

Commercial performance
"In the Bible" debuted at number seven on the Billboard Hot 100, earning 41.4 million streams and 489 thousand in airplay audience and selling 800 thousand  copies in its first week. It became one of the nine Top 10 songs on the chart. The song also peaked at number 18 in Canada, and at number nine on the Billboard Global 200 chart.

Charts

Weekly charts

Year-end charts

References

2021 songs
Drake (musician) songs
Songs written by Drake (musician)
Lil Durk songs
Songs written by Lil Durk
Giveon songs
Songs written by Giveon
Songs written by 40 (record producer)
Song recordings produced by 40 (record producer)